The 1999 Canoe Sprint European Championships were held in Zagreb, Croatia.

Medal overview

Men

Women

Medal table

References

External links
 European Canoe Association

Canoe Sprint European Championships
1999 in Croatian sport
1999 in canoeing
Canoeing in Croatia